A recursive island or lake is an island or a lake that lies within a lake or an island.
For the purposes of defining recursion, small continental land masses such as Madagascar and New Zealand count as islands, while large continental land masses do not. Islands found within lakes in these countries are often recursive islands because the lake itself is located on an island.

Recursive islands

Islands in lakes 

Only a few notable examples are given.

Islands in lakes on islands 

There are nearly 1,000 islands in lakes on islands in Finland alone.

Islands in lakes on islands in lakes

Islands in lakes on islands in lakes on islands 

Until 2020, Vulcan Point was an island that existed in Main Crater Lake on Volcano Island in Lake Taal on Luzon in the Philippines. Main Crater Lake evaporated during the 2020 Taal Volcano eruption, but the water in Taal Lake has returned and has a new island. Vulcan Point became a peninsula.

Islands in lakes on islands in lakes on islands in lakes 
Only one lake is known to have such islands.

Moose Boulder was claimed to exist in the seasonal pond of Moose Flats on Ryan Island in Siskiwit Lake on Isle Royale in Lake Superior in the United States. In 2020, an expedition to the island found that it is potentially a hoax, along with the aforementioned seasonal pond.

Recursive lakes

Lakes on islands 
Only a few notable examples are listed.

Lakes on islands in lakes

Lakes on islands in lakes on islands

Lakes on islands in lakes on islands in lakes 
Only one such lake is known.

See also 

 List of endorheic basins
 Volcanic crater lake
 List of islands by area
 List of lakes by area
 List of islands by population

Notes

References 

Coastal and oceanic landforms
Coastal geography
Lake islands
Lakes
Lists of islands
Recursion